Beneath the Watchful Eyes is the fifteenth album from Arthur Loves Plastic and was released in 2007.

Awards 
Beneath the Watchful Eyes won the 2007 Wammie for Best Recording in the Electronica Category. In the 2009 Just Plain Folks Music Awards the track "Women Alone" was nominated in the Techno Song category.

Release notes 
"Mischievous techno-inspired electronica."

Track listing

Personnel 
Produced by Bev Stanton in the Flamingo Room, Silver Spring, MD.

Additional musicians 
Heavy Lids - Featuring (1, 15)
Lisa Moscatiello - Vocals (3, 4, 5, 6, 7, 8, 9, 11)
Virus Factory - Loops (3) *
Lisa Moscatiello - Guitar (5, 8)
Mental Anguish - Loops (7, 13) *
Cystem - Guitar Loop (9, 14) *
Eric Wenberg - Guitar (11)
DJ Get Yo Fat On - Loops (12, 13) *
International Garbageman - Loops (12) *
Heuristics Inc. - Loops (13) *
Robbie Magruder - Drums (13)

* Remixed for The Tapegerm Collective

Samples 
Suki Taylor - Spoken Word (5)
Sample from "'Tis the Last Rose of Summer" from American Music for Two Guitarists by Phil Mathieu and George Cavallaro (6)
Dialogue from Nights of Love in Lesbos, a reading of The Songs of Bilitis by Pierre Louÿs (12)
Narration from Jason Fortuny's "Craigslist Experiment" (13)
Dialogue from the 1968 film The Killing of Sister George (14)

Credits 
Eli Wadley - Cover photo

References 

Arthur Loves Plastic albums
2007 albums